Schultz Lake may refer to:

Schultz Lake (Meeker County, Minnesota)
Schultz Lake (St. Louis County, Minnesota)
Schultz Lake (Arkansas), a lake in Cleveland County, Arkansas